Bosques Nublados de Udima Wildlife Refuge  (Cloud Forests of Udima Wildlife Refuge) is a protected area of  located in the regions of Cajamarca and Lambayeque, Peru. The cloud forests are the headwaters for rivers providing water for downstream irrigation of farmland. There are also archaeological sites inside the Refuge.

Description
The Cloud Forest Refuge is located mostly in the headwaters of the Zaña River with a small non-contiguous section along the Chancay River and another small non-contiguous section protecting the archaeological site of Poro Poro. The semi-tropical forests in this section, found at elevations above , are the distinguishing feature of the Refuge. The forests are found between the desert coasts of western Peru and the rainforests of the Amazon Basin to the east. The Andes are relatively low in elevation near the Refuge and plant and animal species characteristic of the Amazon rain forest are atypically found here on the western slopes of the Andes. The Refuge of more than 12,000 hectares was carved out of the lands of the Reserved Zone in 2011.

The Zaña River flowing westwards out of the Refuge to the Pacific Ocean supplies irrigation water to an important agricultural valley, especially for sugar cane, centered on the town of Zaña (also spelled Saña). The Zaña River valley, overlooked by the Refuge, contains many pre-Columbian archaeological sites, including the oldest known irrigation canals in the Americas. The canals are dated to 3400 BCE and possibly are as old as 4700 BCE.

Most of the Refuge is located in the Catache District of Santa Cruz Province in Cajamarca Region. Udima had a population of 696 in 2017.

References

External links 

Protected Planet.

Geography of Cajamarca Region
Protected areas established in 2011
Tourist attractions in Cajamarca Region
Protected areas of Peru